Tegeres is a sub-county in the western division of the newly created Kapchorwa municipality in Kapchorwa District, Uganda.

It is the home subcounty of Stephen Kiprotich,  men's marathon gold medalist at the 2012 Olympic Games in London.

Subsistence agriculture is the main economic activity in Kapchorwa District. Crops grown include the following:
Millet
Potatoes
Beans
Simsim
Sunflower
Cotton
Coffee
Wheat
Tomatoes
Cabbage
Passion fruit
Onions
Animal husbandry is practised; the livestock domesticated are mainly cattle, goats, rabbits and chickens

It consists of 7 parishes, 51 villages.
The parishes are;
Kabat
Kapenguria
Kapteret
Kutung
Kapnyikew
Tegeres
Tuban

References

Kapchorwa District